Jan Zoutman (Woerden, 1 August 1969) is a Dutch football coach with a UEFA PRO license. He is the coach of VV Katwijk in the Tweede Divisie and also teaches coaching at the KNVB.

Coaching career
Zoutman coaches since 1987, first youth while playing in SV Argon seniors, then teams in nominal amateur leagues, except for the seasons 2007–2009 with HFC Haarlem and 2013–2014 with Jong FC Twente in the full pro Eerste Divisie. Zoutman won the national Rinus Michels Award and the national amateur championship while coaching SV Argon. He also won the national championship for amateurs with IJsselmeervogels. In October 2018 he replaced Jack van den Berg as manager of VV Katwijk.

References

1969 births
Living people
Dutch football managers
People from Woerden
VV Katwijk managers
Sportspeople from Utrecht (province)